The  Edmonton Eskimos finished 1st in the West Division with a 9–9–0–1 record, but lost the West Final to the Calgary Stampeders. This season's Eskimos became the first West Division team in CFL history to finish first in the division with only a .500 record.

Offseason

CFL Draft

Preseason

Schedule

Regular season

Season standings

Season schedule

Total attendance: 319,572 
Average attendance: 35,510 (59.1%)

Playoffs

Awards and records

References

Edmonton Eskimos
Edmonton Elks seasons
Edmonton Eskimos